Stratton Glacier is a glacier 20 nautical miles (37 km) long, flowing north from Pointer Nunatak and then northwest to the north of Mount Weston, in the Shackleton Range. First mapped in 1957 by the Commonwealth Trans-Antarctic Expedition and named for David G. Stratton, surveyor and deputy leader of the transpolar party of the Commonwealth Trans-Antarctic Expedition in 1956–58.

See also
 List of glaciers in the Antarctic
 Glaciology

References
 
 

Glaciers of Coats Land